Kocijančič is a Slovene surname. Notable people with the surname include:

Andreja Kocijančič, Slovenian doctor
Gorazd Kocijančič (born 1964), Slovene philosopher, poet, and translator
Janez Kocijančič (1941–2020), Slovene politician and lawyer

Slovene-language surnames